The Val di Stava Dam collapse occurred on 19 July 1985, when two tailings dams above the village of Stava, near Tesero, Italy, failed. It resulted in one of Italy's worst disasters, killing 268 people, destroying 63 buildings and demolishing eight bridges.

The upper dam broke first, leading to the collapse of the lower dam. Around 180,000 cubic metres (6,350,000 ft³) of mud, sand, and water were released into the Rio di Stava valley and toward the village of Stava at a speed of 90 km/h (56 mph). Having crashed through the village, the torrent continued until it reached the Avisio River a further 4.2 km (2.6 mi) away, destroying everything in its path.

Cause 
An investigation into the disaster found that the dams were poorly maintained and the margin of safe operation was very small.

A pipe in the upper dam used to drain water had begun to sag under the weight of sediment, making the dam's drainage less effective. Meanwhile, water continued to be pumped into the reservoir behind the dam, which, coupled with the less efficient drainage, meant the pressure on the bank of the upper dam began to increase. Following the path of least resistance, water began penetrating the bank, causing the soil within to liquefy and weaken the bank until it failed. The water and tailings from the upper dam then flowed into the lower dam, which, under the immense pressure produced, failed thirty seconds later.

In June 1992, 10 people were convicted of culpable disaster and multiple manslaughter for their roles in the accident and were all sentenced to prison.

See also 
 List of wars and disasters by death toll: Flood disasters
 National Geographic Seconds From Disaster episodes
 1998 Residue dam wall collapse of the Aznalcollar mine
 2000 Baia Mare cyanide spill
 2010 Ajka alumina plant accident
 Vajont Dam

References

External links 
 Stava tailings dam failure
 Stava official site Fondazione Stava 1985 onlus
 Modern Marvels' 3rd clip (between 20:10 & 28:25) gives very interesting details from locals & others about the Stava disaster: https://youtube.com/watch?v=Hty-6x1u_6A&t=360s

Dams in Italy
Man-made disasters in Italy
Floods in Italy
1985 disasters in Italy
1985 in Italy
Manslaughter trials
Tailings dam failures
July 1985 events in Europe
Dam failures in Europe